Brown Marsh Presbyterian Church, also known as Clarkton Presbyterian Church, is a historic Presbyterian church in Clarkton, Bladen County, North Carolina.  The church was organized prior to 1755 by early Scottish settlers. The current building was built in 1818, and is a small frame pre-Greek Revival style building.  It is the oldest church in Bladen County.

It was added to the National Register of Historic Places in 1975.

References

Presbyterian churches in North Carolina
Churches on the National Register of Historic Places in North Carolina
Churches completed in 1828
19th-century Presbyterian church buildings in the United States
Churches in Bladen County, North Carolina
National Register of Historic Places in Bladen County, North Carolina